Baby Margaretha (born April 1, 1984) is an Indonesian model and actress. She is known for Eyang Kubur (2013), Pocong Mandi Goyang Pinggul (2011) and Misteri Cipularang (2013).

Career
Margaretha began her career in entertainment as a salesperson, then became a model in adult magazines, include FHM and Maxim.

She was in two soap operas: Awas Ada Sule 2 and Komeng Acak Adul, both of it aired on Global TV. Baby began played her first film, Pocong Mandi Goyang Pinggul. She directly to be a lead role and acting with American adult pornography stars Sasha Grey, Sheza Idris, Chand Kelvin, etc.

Filmography

Films
 Pocong Mandi Goyang Pinggul (2011)
 Bangkitnya Suster Gepeng (2012)
 Misteri Cipularang (2013)
 Hantu Cantik Kok Ngompol? (2013)
 Eyang Kubur (2013)

Soap opera
 Awas Ada Sule (Global Tv)
 Komeng Acak Adul (Global Tv)

FTV
 Petaka Gadis Pencuri Rumah Kosong

References

External links 

 
 

Living people
1984 births
21st-century Indonesian actresses
Indonesian female models
Indonesian actresses
Indonesian television actresses